Deopani Durga Mandir(Assamese: দেওপানী  দূৰ্গা মন্দিৰ) is a Hindu Shakta temple of Goddess Durga situated in Asean highway 1, Borsewaguri, Bokajan, Karbi Anglong, Assam, India – 782470.

Location 
{
  "type": "FeatureCollection",
  "features": [
    {
      "type": "Feature",
      "properties": {},
      "geometry": {
        "type": "Point",
        "coordinates": [
          93.74743659049273,
          26.0064367855
        ]
      }
    }
  ]
}

History 
The idol of the temple was excavated along with some other archaeological materials and the temple was established in the site where the idol was discovered. The temple is managed by a  trust. Annual Durga Puja is celebrated in the temple.

References

External Links 
 

Durga temples
Hindu temples in Assam